Canada (AG) v Ontario (AG), also known as In re the Regulation and Control of Aeronautics in Canada and the Aeronautics Reference, is a decision of the Judicial Committee of the Privy Council on the interpretation of the Canadian Constitution. Lord Sankey decided in the case that the federal government has the authority to govern the subject of aeronautics, including licensing of pilots, aircraft, and commercial services and regulations for navigation and safety.

Background

As part of the negotiations at the Paris Peace Conference, the Paris Convention of 1919 set up an international framework for  regulation of aerial navigation. It was drawn up and signed by all parties, including Canada. It was ratified on behalf of the British Empire in 1922, and the Parliament of Canada subsequently passed legislation on the matter. In a federal-provincial conference in 1927, questions were raised as to whether there really was federal jurisdiction to regulate this field.

The following reference questions were posed to the Supreme Court of Canada:

 Have the Parliament and Government of Canada exclusive legislative and executive authority for performing the obligations of Canada, or of any province thereof, under the Convention entitled Convention relating to the Regulation of Aerial Navigation?
 Is legislation of the Parliament of Canada providing for the regulation and control of aeronautics generally within Canada, including flying operations carried on entirely within the limits of a province, necessary or proper for performing the obligations of Canada, or of any province thereof, under the Convention aforementioned, within the meaning of section 132 of the British North America Act, 1867?
 Has the Parliament of Canada legislative authority to enact, in whole or in part, the provisions of section 4 of the Aeronautics Act, chapter 3, Revised Statutes of Canada, 1927?
 Has the Parliament of Canada legislative authority to sanction the making and enforcement, in whole or in part of the regulations contained in the Air Regulations, 1920, respecting—

(а) The granting of certificates or licences authorizing persons to act as pilots, navigators, engineers or inspectors of aircraft and the suspension or revocation of such licences;
(b) The regulation, identification, inspection, certification, and licensing of all aircraft; and
(c) The licensing, inspection and regulation of all aerodromes and air stations?

Reference to the Supreme Court of Canada

In its ruling, the SCC answered the questions as follows:
 
1 & 2. The Parliament of Canada did not gain exclusive authority to regulate the matter under s. 132, but its authority to enforce the Convention's obligations is paramount. It also possesses incidental power to regulate aeronautics under the powers relating to trade and commerce, postal services, defence, and naturalization and aliens, but not under navigation and shipping. The provinces have authority to regulate intraprovincial aviation under s. 92.

3 & 4. Yes, in part

The Attorney General of Canada appealed the ruling with respect to Questions 1, 3 and 4. Question 2 was not formally appealed because of its political nature, but it was conceded in argument that the ruling on the other questions would be sufficient to answer it.

Appeal to the Privy Council

The SCC ruling was reversed on appeal, and the Privy Council answered "Yes" with respect to all three questions. The relevant clauses in the British North America, 1867 that were held to cover the entire field of aeronautics were:

 s.91(2), relating to trade and commerce,
 s.91(5), regarding postal services,
 s.91(7), on militia and defence, and
 s.132, for enforcing international obligations arising from a treaty by the British Empire.

The Privy Council also observed that the real object of the British North America Act, 1867 was to "give the central Government those high functions and almost sovereign powers to which uniformity of legislation might be secured on all questions which were of common concern to all the Provinces as members of a constituent whole." The division of responsibilities between federal and provincial jurisdictions was summarized as follows by Lord Sankey:

Aftermath

Although the underlying Convention was denounced and replaced by a new international convention in 1944 that was not a treaty of the British Empire, it was held in Johannesson v West St. Paul that, in accordance with Ontario v Canada Temperance Federation, the field continued to be within federal jurisdiction under the power relating to peace, order and good government, as by then it had attained a national dimension.

See also
 History of aviation in Canada

References

Canadian federalism case law
Judicial Committee of the Privy Council cases on appeal from Canada
1932 in Canadian case law
Aviation history of Canada